A vilayet ("province"), also known by various other names, was a first-order administrative division of the later Ottoman Empire. It was introduced in the Vilayet Law of 21 January 1867, part of the Tanzimat reform movement initiated by the Ottoman Reform Edict of 1856. The Danube Vilayet had been specially formed in 1864 as an experiment under the leading reformer Midhat Pasha. The Vilayet Law expanded its use, but it was not until 1884 that it was applied to all of the empire's provinces. Writing for the Encyclopaedia Britannica in 1911, Vincent Henry Penalver Caillard claimed that the reform had intended to provide the provinces with greater amounts of local self-government but in fact had the effect of centralizing more power with the sultan and local Muslims at the expense of other communities.

Names
The Ottoman Turkish vilayet was a loanword borrowed from Arabic wilāya, an abstract noun formed from the verb waliya ("to administer"). In Arabic, it had meant "province", "region", or "administration" as general ideas, but following the Tanzimat reforms the Ottoman term formalized it in reference to specific areas in a defined hierarchy.

Organization
The Ottoman Empire had already begun to modernize its administration and regularize its eyalets in the 1840s, but the Vilayet Law extended this throughout the empire, regularizing the following hierarchy of administrative units.

Each vilayet or province was governed by a vali appointed by the sultan. Acting as the sultan's representative, he was notionally the supreme head of administration in his province, subject to various caveats. Military administration was entirely separate, although the vali controlled local police. His council comprised a secretary (mektubci), a comptroller (defterdar), a chief justice (mufettiş-i hukkam-i Şeri'a), and directors of foreign affairs, public works, and agriculture and commerce, each nominated by the respective ministers in Istanbul. The defterdar in particular answered directly to the finance minister rather than the vali. A separate vilayet council was composed of four elected members, comprising two Muslims and two non-Muslims. 

If the vali fell ill or was absent from the capital, he was variously replaced by the governor of the chief sanjak (merkez sanjak) near the capital, the muavin, and the defterdar. A similar structure was replicated in the lower hierarchical levels, with executive and advisory councils drawn from the local administrators and—following long-established practice—the heads of the millets, the various local religious communities.

Sanjaks

Each vilayet was divided into arrondissements, subprovinces, or counties known as sanjaks, livas, or mutasarrifliks. Each sanjak or liva was administered by a sanjakbey or mutasarrif personally appointed by the sultan and a council (idare meclisi) composed of a secretary (tahrirat müdürü), comptroller (muhasebeci), deputy judge (naib), and representatives of the public works board (nafia) and the educational system (maarif).

Kazas

Each sanjak was divided into cantons or districts known as kazas. Each kaza was under a kaymakam and a council composed of a secretary (tahrirat kâtibi), comptroller (mal müdürü), deputy judge, and representatives of the public works board.

Nahiyes

Each kaza was divided into parishes or communes known as nahiyes. Each nahiye was under a müdir appointed by the vali but answerable to the regional kaymakam. He was responsible for local tax collection, court sentences, and maintaining the peace.

Kariyes
Each nahiye was divided into wards and villages (kariye). Each kariye was under a muhtar ("headman") chosen by its inhabitants and confirmed by the regional kaymakam. He was assited in his duties by a local "council of elders" (ihtiyar meclisi).

List

Vilayets, sanjaks and autonomies, c. 1876
Vilayets, sanjaks and autonomies, circa 1876: 

 Constantinople Vilayet
 Adrianople Vilayet: sanjaks of Adrianople (Edirne), Tekirdağ, Gelibolu, Filibe, Sliven.
 Danube Vilayet: sanjaks of Ruse, Varna, Vidin, Tulcea, Turnovo, Sofia, Niš. 
 Bosnia Vilayet: sanjaks of Bosna-Serai, Zvornik, Banja Luka, Travnik, Bebkèh, Novi Pazar.
 Vilayet of Herzegovina: sanjaks of Mostar, Gacko.
 Salonica Vilayet: sanjaks of Salonica, Serres, Drama.
 Janina Vilayet: sanjaks of Ioannina, Tirhala, Ohrid, Preveze, Berat.
 Monastir Vilayet: sanjaks of Manastir (now Bitola), Prizren, Üsküb, Dibra.
 Scutari Vilayet: sanjak of Scutari.
 Vilayet of the Archipelago: sanjaks of Rhodes, Midilli, Sakız, Kos, Cyprus.
 Vilayet of Crete: sanjaks of Chania, Rethymno, Candia, Sfakia, Lasithi.
 Vilayet of Hudavendigar: sanjaks of Bursa, Izmid, Karasi, Karahisar-i-Sarip, Kütahya.
 Vilayet of Aidin: sanjaks of Smyrna (now İzmir), Aydın, Saruhan, Menteşe.
 Vilayet of Angora: sanjaks of Angora (now Ankara), Yozgat, Kayseri, Kırşehir.
 Vilayet of Konya: sanjaks of Konya, Teke, Hamid, Niğde, Burdur.
 Vilayet of Kastamonu: sanjaks of Kastamonu, Boli, Sinop, Çankırı.
 Kosovo Vilayet
 Vilayet of Trebizond: sanjaks of Trebizond (Trabzon), Gümüşhane, Batumi, Canik.
 Vilayet of Sivas: sanjaks of Sivas, Amasya, Karahisar-ı Şarki.
 Vilayet of Erzurum: sanjaks of Erzurum, Tchaldir, Bayezit, Kars, Mouch, Erzincan, Van.
 Vilayet of Diyarbekir: sanjaks of Diyarbakır, Mamuret-ul-Aziz, Mardin, Siirt, Malatya.
 Vilayet of Adana: sanjaks of Adana, Kozan, İçel, Paias.
 Vilayet of Syria: sanjaks of Damascus, Hama, Beirut, Tripoli, Hauran, Akka, Belka, Kudus-i-Cherif (Jerusalem).
 Vilayet of Aleppo: sanjaks of Aleppo, Maraş, Urfa, Zor.
 Vilayet of Baghdad: sanjaks of Baghdad, Mosul, Sharazor, Sulaymaniyah, Dialim, Kerbela, Helleh, Amara.
 Vilayet of Basra: sanjaks of Basra, Muntafiq, Najd, Hejaz.
 Emirate of Mecca: Mecca, Medina.
 Vilayet of Yemen: sanjaks of Sana'a, Hudaydah, Asir, Ta'izz.
 Vilayet of Tripolitania: sanjaks of Tripoli, Bengazi, Khoms, Djebal gharbiyeh, Fezzan.
 Mount Lebanon Mutasarrifate
 Principality of Samos
 Mount Athos (part of the Sanjak of Salonica)

Vilayets and independent sanjaks in 1917
Vilayets and independent sanjaks in 1917:

Vassals and autonomies

 Eastern Rumelia (Rumeli-i Şarkî): autonomous province (Vilayet in Turkish) (1878–1885); unified with Bulgaria in 1885
 Sanjak of Benghazi (Bingazi Sancağı): autonomous sanjak. Formerly in the vilayet of Tripoli, but after 1875 dependent directly on the ministry of the interior at Constantinople.
 Sanjak of Biga (Biga Sancağı) (also called Kale-i Sultaniye) (autonomous sanjak, not a vilayet)
 Sanjak of Çatalca (Çatalca Sancağı) (autonomous sanjak, not a vilayet)
 Cyprus (Kıbrıs) (island with special status) (Kıbrıs Adası)
 Khedivate of Egypt (Mısır) (autonomous khedivate, not a vilayet) (Mısır Hidivliği)
 Sanjak of Izmit (İzmid Sancağı) (autonomous sanjak, not a vilayet)
 Mutasarrifyya/Sanjak of Jerusalem (Kudüs-i Şerif Mutasarrıflığı): independent and directly linked to the Minister of the Interior in view of its importance to the three major monotheistic religions.
Sharifate of Mecca (Mekke Şerifliği) (autonomous sharifate, not a vilayet)
Mount Lebanon Mutasarrifate (Cebel-i Lübnan Mutasarrıflığı): sanjak or mutessariflik, dependent directly on the Porte.
Principality of Samos (Sisam Beyliği) (island with special status)
Tunis Eyalet (Tunus Eyaleti) (autonomous eyalet, ruled by hereditary beys)

Maps

See also
 Provinces of Turkey
 Six vilayets, the Armenian vilayets of the empire
 Vilayet Law

References

Further reading
  - About the Law of the Vilayets

External links
 Vilayet Law of 1864, official translation to French pp. 36–45, in Young, George, Corps de droit ottoman; recueil des codes, lois, règlements, ordonnances et actes les plus importants du droit intérieur, et d'études sur le droit coutumier de l'Empire ottoman, Volume 1, 1905.
 Vilayet Law of 1867, in French, in Législation ottomane, published by Gregory Aristarchis and edited by Demetrius Nicolaides, Volume 2

Arabic words and phrases

Subdivisions of the Ottoman Empire
Former types of subdivisions of Bosnia and Herzegovina
Types of administrative division